The IFSC Paraclimbing World Championships are the biennial world championships for competition climbing for people with disabilities organized by the International Federation of Sport Climbing (IFSC). This event determines the male and female world champions in various categories.

The first event was organized in Arco in 2011, held together with the IFSC Climbing World Championships.

Championships

Classifications and Categories
The classifications and categories of the competition changed over the years. Below is the latest version, quoted from the IFSC 2018 rules.

A large number of RP conditions are neurological disabilities such as MS, stroke survivors, brain damage and so on. There are a number of competitors who climb similarly to an AL/AU athlete due to a condition/accident that has affected the development or use of a limb, placing them in the RP category instead.

When a category has no competitors entered into it, it doesn't run; but when a category has a few competitors (just not enough to officially run) this category gets merged into what is deemed to be a tougher category.

Men's results

Speed

Lead

Women's Results

Speed

Lead

References

External links 
 
 

IFSC Climbing World Championships
Climbing competitions
World championships
Recurring sporting events established in 2011